The 1885 WAFA season was the first season of senior Australian rules football in Perth, Western Australia.

The first WAFL game was played at the Esplanade Reserve between Rovers and Victorians on Saturday 6 June 1885. Rovers won the game by a goal. The final score was Rovers 1.6 defeated Victorians 0.6.

References

West Australian Football League seasons
WAFL